Changi Single Member Constituency was a single member constituency covering Changi and eastern outer islands such as Pulau Ubin, Singapore.

Constituency changes

Member of Parliament

Elections

Elections in 1950s

Note 1: In 1957, Singapore Malay Union (SMU) was expelled by its alliance partners consisted of UMNO and MCA for fielding a candidate in that by-election which was the reason for the elections department of Singapore to view Fatimah as another independent candidate.

Note 2: Lim Cher Kheng was the then incumbent seeking for another term. He represented the Democratic Party (Not to be confused with the Singapore Democratic Party, which was only formed after Singapore's independence.) which was dissolved by merging with Progressive Party (Singapore) as Liberal Socialist Party within a year from the 1955 General elections. With that consideration, the vote swing for both independent candidate Lim and Liberal Socialist Party candidate Wee will be taken from Lim's previous election result because that is the result for the candidate himself and his party respectively.

Note 3: UMNO, MCA and MIC together with Singapore People's Alliance was informally formed as an alliance in 1961, where it still within this term of election  which was the reason for the elections department of Singapore to view Abdul Rahman as a candidate for Singapore Alliance.

Elections in 1960s 

Note: One of the component party in Singapore Alliance is United Malays National Organisation (UMNO), and hence the swing will be based on its previous election of UMNO candidate.

Elections in 1970s

Elections in 1980s

Elections in 1990s

Historical maps

See also
East Coast GRC
Aljunied GRC

References

1991 GE's result
1988 GE's result
1984 GE's result
1980 GE's result
1976 GE's result
1972 GE's result
1968 GE's result
1963 GE's result
1959 GE's result
Brief History on Singapore Malay Union (Dissolved in 1960s)
Brief History on Democratic Party (Dissolved in 1956)
Brief History on Singapore Alliance

Changi